Mackenzie Bent (born June 11, 1997) is a Canadian ice dancer. With partner Dmitre Razgulajevs, she is the 2016 Canadian junior champion. With former partner Garrett MacKeen, she is the 2014 Canadian junior champion and finished 5th at two World Junior Championships.

Personal life 
Mackenzie Bent was born on June 11, 1997 in Port Perry, Ontario, Canada. In 2016, she studied international relations at the University of Toronto.

Career

Partnership with MacKeen 
Bent/MacKeen won the novice bronze medal at the Canadian Championships in January 2011. Making their ISU Junior Grand Prix (JGP) debut, they took the bronze medal in Braşov, Romania in September of the same year. They placed fifth at their second JGP assignment, in Tallinn, Estonia, and fourth on the junior level at the 2012 Canadian Championships.

Bent/MacKeen returned to the JGP series in 2012–13, winning a bronze medal in Linz, Austria and placing fourth in Zagreb, Croatia. Junior silver medalists at the 2013 Canadian Championships, they were named in Canada's team to the 2013 World Junior Championships in Milan, Italy. Ranked fourth in the short dance and seventh in the free dance, they finished fifth overall in their debut at the competition.

Competing in the 2013–14 JGP series, Bent/MacKeen won gold in Riga, Latvia and finished 6th in Košice, Slovakia. After winning the junior title at the 2014 Canadian Championships, they were assigned to the 2014 World Junior Championships in Sofia, Bulgaria; they placed ninth in the short, 12th in the free, and 12th overall.

During the 2014–15 JGP season, Bent/MacKeen won gold in Ostrava, Czech Republic and silver in Tallinn, Estonia. Their results qualified them for the 2014–15 JGP Final in Barcelona, where they placed fourth. Having already won the junior title, they were required to compete on the senior level at the 2015 Canadian Championships. They finished sixth and were sent again to Tallinn to compete at their third Junior Worlds. They came in fifth after ranking second in the short and eighth in the free. They parted ways at the end of the season.

Partnership with Razgulajevs 
Bent teamed up with Dmitre Razgulajevs in spring 2015. Making their international debut, they won the silver medal at the 2015–16 ISU Junior Grand Prix event in Colorado Springs, Colorado. They finished 5th at their second JGP assignment, in Logroño, Spain. The two missed the Skate Canada Challenge in December because Razgulajevs experienced vertigo but the following month they won the junior gold medal at the 2016 Canadian Championships. Ranked ninth in both segments, they finished ninth at the 2016 World Junior Championships in Debrecen, Hungary.

Having aged out of juniors, Bent/Razgulajevs moved up to the senior level in the 2016–17 season. They placed fourth at the Lake Placid Ice Dance International.

Programs

With Razgulajevs

With MacKeen

Competitive highlights 
CS: Challenger Series; JGP: Junior Grand Prix

With Razgulajevs

With MacKeen

References

External links 

 
 

1997 births
Canadian female ice dancers
Living people
People from Scugog